Thomas William Simcox (born June 17, 1937) is an American film and television actor.

Early life 
Simcox was born in Medford, New Jersey.

Career 
Simcox began his career in 1962, first appearing in the police procedural television series Naked City. He then made an appearance to the medical drama television series Ben Casey. He guest-starred in television programs including Gunsmoke, Bonanza, Hawaii Five-O, Matt Houston, Ironside, The Virginian, Vega$, Charlie's Angels, Trapper John, M.D., Perry Mason, Columbo and Wagon Train. In 1964, he made his film debut for which Simcox first appeared in the television film The Ghost of Sierra de Cobre. He then played the role of Lt. Johnson in the 1965 film Shenandoah.

Simcox starred in the 1966 film Incident at Phantom Hill, which also starred Robert Fuller, Jocelyn Lane and Dan Duryea. He also made an appearance in the 1976 film Hollywood Man, which starred William Smith, Ray Girardin, Jude Farese and Jennifer Billingsley. Simcox played the role of the sheriff. In 1977, he starred in the action and adventure television series Code R. His final credit was from Jack Webb's Dragnet remake which was The New Dragnet in 1991.

Filmography

Film

Television

References

External links 

Rotten Tomatoes profile

1937 births
Living people
People from Medford, New Jersey
Male actors from New Jersey
American male film actors
American male television actors
20th-century American male actors